Ellie Johnston (born 24 October 2000) is an Australian rugby league footballer who plays as a  for the Parramatta Eels in the NRL Women's Premiership and the South Sydney Rabbitohs in the NSWRL Women's Premiership.

Background
Born in Taree, New South Wales, Johnston began playing rugby league for the Wauchope Thunder in 2018. She had previously represented Australia under-17 at indoor netball.

Playing career
In May 2019, after playing for the North Coast Bulldogs at the Women's Country Championships, Johnston was selected to represent NSW Country at the Women's National Championships.

In September 2020, she joined the St George Illawarra Dragons NRL Women's Premiership team. In Round 1 of the 2020 NRLW season, she made her debut for the Dragons in a 18–4 loss to the Sydney Roosters.
In the 2021 and 2022 NRL Women's Premiership seasons Ellie played as a prop forward for the Parramatta Eels.

References

External links
St George Illawarra Dragons profile

2000 births
Living people
Australian female rugby league players
Rugby league props
St. George Illawarra Dragons (NRLW) players